Siswinahalli is a village in Dharwad district of Karnataka, India.

Demographics 
As of the 2011 Census of India there were 447 households in Siswinahalli and a total population of 2,243 consisting of 1,138 males and 1,105 females. There were 254 children ages 0-6.

References

Villages in Dharwad district